The  is a diesel multiple unit (DMU) train type operated by Japanese National Railways  in Japan since November 1986, and later operated by Kyushu Railway Company (JR Kyushu) and Shikoku Railway Company (JR Shikoku)

Fleet
, JR Kyushu operates 20 vehicles, and JR Shikoku operates 32 vehicles.

See also
 Joyful Train

References

External links

 185 series details on JR Shikoku website 

185 series
185 series
185 series
Train-related introductions in 1986